Codemaster or code master or variant, may refer to:

 Code master or Master coder, a master computer programmer
 Cipher master, a secret code master, a cryptographer
 Codemaster, a character class from Chaotic (TV series)
 Codemasters, a UK videogame company

See also

 
 Code (disambiguation)
 Master (disambiguation)